Le Juste Prix ("The Fair Price") is a French adaptation of the American game show The Price Is Right that airs on TF1. It first premiered in 1988 and ran until the original version was canceled in 2001. In 2002 a brief sequel, Le Juste Euro, ran on France 2 and was hosted by Patrice Laffont, it only ran for two episodes. On July 27, 2009 a new version of Le Juste Prix premiered on TF1. This version, which aired for six years, was hosted by Vincent Lagaf with Gerard Vivès as announcer.

1987–2001
While all price elements were intact, the series utilized format changes that were exclusive and unique to this version. Here is a list of the format changes:

1987–88: Airing only on Sunday, this format featured three pricing games, and used the Big Wheel (La Roue) to determine the two Showcase (La Vitrine) players, with players spinning only once. A variation of this format would be used on the German version of TPiR, when it premiered in 1989.

1988–2000: The format most fans are familiar with, the show expanded to seven days a week. On the Monday-Saturday shows, the show used the 1987 format, but there was only one La Roue winner; that person moved on to the Sunday finals; that used the traditional hour-long format, with the two La Roue winners advancing to La Vitrine. Since 1995, 100 on the wheel in one spin won a bonus of 1,000F (€152) which increased with each spin of the wheel.

1998–2000: Starting in 1998, the daily winners got a chance to win a trip, by playing a version of Clock Game called "Le Grand Voyage", in which the player has 20 seconds to guess the price of the trip. This game moved to the regular lineup in 2000.

2000–01: Losing the weekend airings, the new Monday-Friday shows kept the hour format, but the two La Roue winners faced off in a new La Vitrine, a hybrid of the U.S. and European Showcase formats. The top winner stopped a range finder with values ranging from 5,000F (€762) to 30,000F (€4,573). A single Showcase (usually over 100,000F [€15,244]) was presented; both players bid on it, and the one closest to the actual retail price and within range without going over won.

In the final season, when the euro was coming into effect, all games gave their prizes and prices in both francs and euros.

Pricing Games
The name of the original pricing game in the US version is given in parentheses. Many of these follow the same rules and gameplay as the US version; for details, see List of The Price Is Right pricing games.

1987-1998

1998-2001

Pricing games exclusive to Le Juste Prix

Le Juste Euro
A short-lived remake of the show called Le Juste Euro (The Euro Fair) aired on France 2 hosted by Patrice Laffont with Jean-Marie Castile as the announcer from December 31, 2001 until January 19, 2002. Originally, they wanted to call it Dites-le en Euro! (Say it in Euro!) in order to separate it from Le Juste Prix.

Le marathon des Jeux TV
In 2006, Le Juste Prix was part of the series called Le Marathon des Jeux TV (The Marathon of TV Games) also airing on France 2 hosted by Nagui and Pascal Sellem.

2009–15
When the series returned, it utilised one of the largest Price sets in the world, a two-story structure so big (as are some props), certain games required players to head to the second level.

The winner of La Roue played a revamped La Vitrine, an exact copy of Le Grand Voyage, except the player had 25 seconds (and a given range) to guess the price of the Showcase, which ranged from €10,000-€100,000. One Bid items also vary, ranging from at least €20 to €1,000.

In addition, the theme song was a "Whistled" remix of the theme previously used in 2001.

Pricing games

Other International versions
Most international versions, such as those of Australia and Belgium, had their sets and logo be inspired by the 2009 French version.

See also
 List of French Adaptations of Television Series from Other Countries

References

External links
 

1988 French television series debuts
French game shows
French television series based on American television series
The Price Is Right
Television series by Fremantle (company)
1980s French television series